The Hunt class is a class of thirteen mine countermeasure vessels of the Royal Navy. As built, they combined the separate roles of the traditional minesweeper and that of the active minehunter in one hull, but later modifications saw the removal of mine-sweeping equipment. They have a secondary role as offshore patrol vessels.

Development
Upon introduction in the early 1980s they were the largest warships ever built out of glass-reinforced plastic and were the last in operation to use the Napier Deltic diesel engine.

The capabilities of the remaining eight vessels of the Hunt class have been significantly enhanced by the installation of Sonar Type 2193 and the NAUTIS 3 command system. In late 2007 Chiddingfold  used the Seafox drone, the Royal Navy's mine disposal system, during Exercise Neptune Warrior off Scotland. Seafox is described by the MOD as a "state of the art fire and forget system, capable of destroying mines in depths of up to 300 metres".

The 2021 defence white paper announced that all the Hunt-class vessels would be retired from Royal Navy service in the 2020s and replaced by automated systems. It was subsequently indicated that the withdrawal would occur in the 2029 to 2031 period.

Ships in the class
All 13 ships of this class re-used names from the World War II .

See also
Sandown-class minehunter

References

External links

Patrol vessels of the United Kingdom
 
Mine warfare vessel classes
Napier Deltic
Ship classes of the Royal Navy